The Bedford Highway is a highway in the  Halifax Regional Municipality, Nova Scotia that is part of Trunk 2. It runs around the western side of the Bedford Basin. The highway starts at the Windsor Street intersection on the Halifax Peninsula and passes by the communities of Fairview, Rockingham, and Bedford, where it becomes part of Trunk 1 to Highway 101 .

Historically the Bedford Highway was part of the route from Halifax to Windsor, but also formed the first stage of a journey to Truro, with Sackville's Twelve Mile House staging inn marking the start of the Truro road. The never-completed Annapolis Road also began on the Bedford Highway, at today's intersection with Kearney Lake Road, which is believed to partly follow the alignment of the early road.

Notable places
Fairview Lawn Cemetery
Mount Saint Vincent University
Rockingham Community Center
Clearwater
Mill Cove Plaza
The Chickenburger
Sunnyside Mall
Bedford Place Mall
Bedford Range Ballpark
House of Intercessory Prayer Ministries (HIPM)

Major intersections

References

Roads in Halifax, Nova Scotia